Bør Børson Jr. is a 1974 Norwegian musical film directed by Jan Erik Düring, starring Rolv Wesenlund, Britt Langlie and Sølvi Wang. The film is based on a novel by Johan Falkberget.

Bør Børson Jr. (Wesenlund) is a peasant son with great ambitions. He starts a grocery store and – after some initial problems – makes a good deal of money. He then leaves for Oslo, where he makes a fortune in the stock trade. Eventually, he returns to his hometown, where he holds a lavish wedding with his childhood sweetheart.

The film contained popular songs such as "Å æ kjinne ein kar", "Børs Song" and "Wienerbrød-tango", first introduced at the stage version of the musical in 1972.

References

External links
 
 

1974 films
1970s musical films
Norwegian musical films
Films directed by Jan Erik Düring